Glengarry County, an area covering , is a former county in the province of Ontario, Canada. It is historically known for its settlement of Scottish Highlanders. Glengarry County now consists of the modern-day townships of North Glengarry and South Glengarry and it borders the Saint Lawrence River.

Glengarry was founded in 1784 by Scottish loyalists, mainly from Clan Donald, and other Highland Scottish emigrants from the Mohawk Valley in New York. The Crown granted them land and helped with supplies the first winter, as compensation for their losses in New York. Some veterans received land instead of pay for their salaries. In addition, the settlement was founded as a destination for Scottish emigrants arriving after the recent Highland Clearances. Great Britain hoped the new immigrants would help settle and develop this area, which became known as Upper Canada and later Ontario. Throughout the late 18th and the 19th century, other Highland emigrants settled into the community as a means of preserving their Scottish Highland Culture. The county was named after the Scottish Glen, where the MacDonell family was based. The Glengarry Highland Games are an example of the county's historic culture, first celebrated in 1948. They have been held annually since, during the weekend before the first Monday in August. These Games are one of the largest of their kind outside Scotland, attracting visitors from all over the world. The original territory of Glengarry also included Prescott County, which became a separate county in 1800.

Canadian Gaelic (i.e. Canadian Scottish Gaelic) used to be a common language in this region. Though the number of speakers has steadily decreased over the past years, those wanting to learn Gaelic form classes throughout Glengarry.

Glengarry united with Stormont and Dundas in 1850 to form the United Counties of Stormont, Dundas and Glengarry.

Historic townships

Glengarry was originally divided east and west into Charlottenburgh and Lancaster townships, and then eventually divided into four townships. It has since been divided into North and South Glengarry.
 Charlottenburgh – now in South Glengarry Township, it was named in honour of Queen Charlotte.
 Kenyon – now in North Glengarry Township. Kenyon Township was taken from Charlottenburg Township in 1798, and was named from the English Chief Justice Lloyd Kenyon, 1st Baron Kenyon
 Lancaster – now in South Glengarry Township. Surveyed in 1784, it was first settled in 1785.
 Lochiel – now in North Glengarry. Lochiel Township separated from Lancaster Township on November 24, 1818. Lochiel was named after the chief of the Clan Cameron. This clan had many representatives among the veteran settlers.

See also
 List of Ontario census divisions
 List of townships in Ontario
 Canadian Gaelic

References

External links
 Township of South Glengarry
 Township of North Glengarry
 Glengarry County Map (1879)

Former counties in Ontario

Scottish-Canadian culture in Ontario